Cissachroa is a monotypic moth genus of the family Crambidae described by Alfred Jefferis Turner in 1937. Its only species, Cissachroa callischema, described in the same article, is found in Australia.

References

Spilomelinae
Monotypic moth genera
Taxa named by Alfred Jefferis Turner
Crambidae genera